The Tolchards Devon Cricket League is the top level of competition for recreational club cricket in Devon, England, and the League Headquarters is in Little Torrington, Devon. The league was founded in 1972, and since 2000 it has been a designated ECB Premier League.

The league consists of a Premier division of 10 teams, and 14 feeder divisions lettered A-H, regionalised to East and West in the C-H divisions. Prior to the 2013 season, it was possible to obtain a draw in a game if the side batting second was not bowled out, but since then each innings in a match is limited to a number of overs (which varies depending on the division) and the team with the higher total from their allotted overs wins.

Winners
 

 

 
Source: Devon Cricket League

Performance by season from 2000

See also
 Devon County Cricket Club

References

External links
 Devon Cricket website
 play-cricket website

English domestic cricket competitions
Cricket in Devon
ECB Premier Leagues